Edward Frederick Brewtnall  (London 13 October 1846 – 13 November 1902 London) was a British genre, landscape and figure painter and illustrator.

Life
He was born in London on 13 October 1846.	
He studied at the Lambeth School of Art.

Based in London, Brewtnall worked in both oil and watercolour, exhibiting, from 1868, at the Royal Academy, Society of British Artists, Grosvenor Gallery and the Royal Watercolour Society (RWS) - he was made a full member of the latter in 1883. He was also a member of the Royal Society of British Artists (RBA) and the Royal Institute of Oil Painters (ROI).

Brewtnall had a particular interest in Folk tales and Ballads which became the subjects of many of his paintings such as "Cinderella", "The Frog Princess" (1880), "Little Red Riding Hood" (1895), "Sleeping Beauty" etc. He provided artwork for The Graphic, Pall Mall Magazine, The Quiver, and English Illustrated Magazine, among other magazines and periodicals, and illustrated books such as Barnard's edition of Bunyan's "Pilgrim's Progress" and others.

Gallery

References

Further reading 
Huish, Marcus Bourne. British water-colour art in the first year of the reign of King Edward the Seventh (London Fine Art Society, A & C Black, 1904) pp. 88–89.

External links

E. F. Brewtnall online (ArtCyclopedia).
Works by E. F. Brewtnall (Bridgeman Art Library)
The final cast of the day  (Oil on canvas - Christie's)
The Ambush (Watercolour - Christie's).
E. F. Brewtnall (Artnet.com)
E. F. Brewtnall - biography and works (ArtMagick)

19th-century English painters
English male painters
20th-century English painters
English watercolourists
English illustrators
British speculative fiction artists
British genre painters
Fantasy artists
1846 births
1902 deaths
19th-century English male artists
20th-century English male artists